A battleship is a large armored warship with a main battery consisting of large caliber guns. It dominated naval warfare in the late 19th and early 20th centuries.

The term battleship came into use in the late 1880s to describe a type of ironclad warship, now referred to by historians as pre-dreadnought battleships. In 1906, the commissioning of  into the United Kingdom's Royal Navy heralded a revolution in the field of battleship design. Subsequent battleship designs, influenced by HMS Dreadnought, were referred to as "dreadnoughts", though the term eventually became obsolete as dreadnoughts became the only type of battleship in common use.

Battleships were a symbol of naval dominance and national might, and for decades the battleship was a major factor in both diplomacy and military strategy. A global arms race in battleship construction began in Europe in the 1890s and culminated at the decisive Battle of Tsushima in 1905, the outcome of which significantly influenced the design of HMS Dreadnought. The launch of Dreadnought in 1906 commenced a new naval arms race. Three major fleet actions between steel battleships took place: the long-range gunnery duel at the Battle of the Yellow Sea in 1904, the decisive Battle of Tsushima in 1905 (both during the Russo-Japanese War) and the inconclusive Battle of Jutland in 1916, during the First World War. Jutland was the largest naval battle and the only full-scale clash of dreadnoughts of the war, and it was the last major battle in naval history fought primarily by battleships.

The Naval Treaties of the 1920s and 1930s limited the number of battleships, though technical innovation in battleship design continued. Both the Allied and Axis powers built battleships during World War II, though the increasing importance of the aircraft carrier meant that the battleship played a less important role than had been expected in that conflict.

The value of the battleship has been questioned, even during their heyday. There were few of the decisive fleet battles that battleship proponents expected and used to justify the vast resources spent on building battlefleets. Even in spite of their huge firepower and protection, battleships were increasingly vulnerable to much smaller and relatively inexpensive weapons: initially the torpedo and the naval mine, and later aircraft and the guided missile. The growing range of naval engagements led to the aircraft carrier replacing the battleship as the leading capital ship during World War II, with the last battleship to be launched being  in 1944. Four battleships were retained by the United States Navy until the end of the Cold War for fire support purposes and were last used in combat during the Gulf War in 1991. The last battleships were struck from the U.S. Naval Vessel Register in the 2000s. Many World War II-era battleships remain in use today as museum ships.

History

Ships of the line

A ship of the line was a large, unarmored wooden sailing ship which mounted a battery of up to 120 smoothbore guns and carronades, which came to prominence with the adoption of line of battle tactics in the early 17th century and the end of the sailing battleship's heyday in the 1830s. From 1794, the alternative term 'line of battle ship' was contracted (informally at first) to 'battle ship' or 'battleship'.

The sheer number of guns fired broadside meant a ship of the line could wreck any wooden enemy, holing her hull, knocking down masts, wrecking her rigging, and killing her crew. However, the effective range of the guns was as little as a few hundred yards, so the battle tactics of sailing ships depended in part on the wind.

Over time, ships of the line gradually became larger and carried more guns, but otherwise remained quite similar. The first major change to the ship of the line concept was the introduction of steam power as an auxiliary propulsion system. Steam power was gradually introduced to the navy in the first half of the 19th century, initially for small craft and later for frigates. The French Navy introduced steam to the line of battle with the 90-gun  in 1850—the first true steam battleship. This was a potentially decisive advantage in a naval engagement. The introduction of steam accelerated the growth in size of battleships. France and the United Kingdom were the only countries to develop fleets of wooden steam screw battleships although several other navies operated small numbers of screw battleships, including Russia (9), the Ottoman Empire (3), Sweden (2), Naples (1), Denmark (1) and Austria (1).

Ironclads

The adoption of steam power was only one of a number of technological advances which revolutionized warship design in the 19th century. The ship of the line was overtaken by the ironclad: powered by steam, protected by metal armor, and armed with guns firing high-explosive shells.

Explosive shells
Guns that fired explosive or incendiary shells were a major threat to wooden ships, and these weapons quickly became widespread after the introduction of 8-inch shell guns as part of the standard armament of French and American line-of-battle ships in 1841. In the Crimean War, six line-of-battle ships and two frigates of the Russian Black Sea Fleet destroyed seven Turkish frigates and three corvettes with explosive shells at the Battle of Sinop in 1853. Later in the war, French ironclad floating batteries used similar weapons against the defenses at the Battle of Kinburn.

Nevertheless, wooden-hulled ships stood up comparatively well to shells, as shown in the 1866 Battle of Lissa, where the modern Austrian steam two-decker  ranged across a confused battlefield, rammed an Italian ironclad and took 80 hits from Italian ironclads, many of which were shells, but including at least one 300-pound shot at point-blank range. Despite losing her bowsprit and her foremast, and being set on fire, she was ready for action again the very next day.

Iron armor and construction

The development of high-explosive shells made the use of iron armor plate on warships necessary. In 1859 France launched , the first ocean-going ironclad warship. She had the profile of a ship of the line, cut to one deck due to weight considerations. Although made of wood and reliant on sail for most journeys, Gloire was fitted with a propeller, and her wooden hull was protected by a layer of thick iron armor. Gloire prompted further innovation from the Royal Navy, anxious to prevent France from gaining a technological lead.

The superior armored frigate  followed Gloire by only 14 months, and both nations embarked on a program of building new ironclads and converting existing screw ships of the line to armored frigates.

Navies experimented with the positioning of guns, in turrets (like the USS Monitor), central-batteries or barbettes, or with the ram as the principal weapon. As steam technology developed, masts were gradually removed from battleship designs. By the mid-1870s steel was used as a construction material alongside iron and wood. The French Navy's , laid down in 1873 and launched in 1876, was a central battery and barbette warship which became the first battleship in the world to use steel as the principal building material.

Pre-dreadnought battleship

The term "battleship" was officially adopted by the Royal Navy in the re-classification of 1892. By the 1890s, there was an increasing similarity between battleship designs, and the type that later became known as the 'pre-dreadnought battleship' emerged. These were heavily armored ships, mounting a mixed battery of guns in turrets, and without sails. An early design with superficial similarity to the pre-dreadnought is the British  of 1871.

The slow-firing  main guns were the principal weapons for battleship-to-battleship combat. The intermediate and secondary batteries had two roles. Against major ships, it was thought a 'hail of fire' from quick-firing secondary weapons could distract enemy gun crews by inflicting damage to the superstructure, and they would be more effective against smaller ships such as cruisers. Smaller guns (12-pounders and smaller) were reserved for protecting the battleship against the threat of torpedo attack from destroyers and torpedo boats.

The beginning of the pre-dreadnought era coincided with Britain reasserting her naval dominance. For many years previously, Britain had taken naval supremacy for granted. Expensive naval projects were criticized by political leaders of all inclinations. However, in 1888 a war scare with France and the build-up of the Russian navy gave added impetus to naval construction, and the British Naval Defence Act of 1889 laid down a new fleet including eight new battleships. The principle that Britain's navy should be more powerful than the two next most powerful fleets combined was established. This policy was designed to deter France and Russia from building more battleships, but both nations nevertheless expanded their fleets with more and better pre-dreadnoughts in the 1890s.

In the last years of the 19th century and the first years of the 20th, the escalation in the building of battleships became an arms race between Britain and Germany. The German naval laws of 1890 and 1898 authorized a fleet of 38 battleships, a vital threat to the balance of naval power. Britain answered with further shipbuilding, but by the end of the pre-dreadnought era, British supremacy at sea had markedly weakened. In 1883, the United Kingdom had 38 battleships, twice as many as France and almost as many as the rest of the world put together. In 1897, Britain's lead was far smaller due to competition from France, Germany, and Russia, as well as the development of pre-dreadnought fleets in Italy, the United States and Japan. The Ottoman Empire, Spain, Sweden, Denmark, Norway, the Netherlands, Chile and Brazil all had second-rate fleets led by armored cruisers, coastal defence ships or monitors.

Pre-dreadnoughts continued the technical innovations of the ironclad. Turrets, armor plate, and steam engines were all improved over the years, and torpedo tubes were also introduced. A small number of designs, including the American  and es, experimented with all or part of the 8-inch intermediate battery superimposed over the 12-inch primary. Results were poor: recoil factors and blast effects resulted in the 8-inch battery being completely unusable, and the inability to train the primary and intermediate armaments on different targets led to significant tactical limitations. Even though such innovative designs saved weight (a key reason for their inception), they proved too cumbersome in practice.

Dreadnought era

In 1906, the British Royal Navy launched the revolutionary . Created as a result of pressure from Admiral Sir John ("Jackie") Fisher, HMS Dreadnought rendered existing battleships obsolete. Combining an "all-big-gun" armament of ten 12-inch (305 mm) guns with unprecedented speed (from steam turbine engines) and protection, she prompted navies worldwide to re-evaluate their battleship building programs. While the Japanese had laid down an all-big-gun battleship, in 1904 and the concept of an all-big-gun ship had been in circulation for several years, it had yet to be validated in combat. Dreadnought sparked a new arms race, principally between Britain and Germany but reflected worldwide, as the new class of warships became a crucial element of national power.

Technical development continued rapidly through the dreadnought era, with steep changes in armament, armor and propulsion. Ten years after Dreadnoughts commissioning, much more powerful ships, the super-dreadnoughts, were being built.

Origin

In the first years of the 20th century, several navies worldwide experimented with the idea of a new type of battleship with a uniform armament of very heavy guns.

Admiral Vittorio Cuniberti, the Italian Navy's chief naval architect, articulated the concept of an all-big-gun battleship in 1903. When the Regia Marina did not pursue his ideas, Cuniberti wrote an article in Janes proposing an "ideal" future British battleship, a large armored warship of 17,000 tons, armed solely with a single calibre main battery (twelve 12-inch [305 mm] guns), carrying  belt armor, and capable of 24 knots (44 km/h).

The Russo-Japanese War provided operational experience to validate the "all-big-gun" concept. During the Battle of the Yellow Sea on August 10, 1904, Admiral Togo of the Imperial Japanese Navy commenced deliberate 12-inch gun fire at the Russian flagship Tzesarevich at 14,200 yards (13,000 meters). At the Battle of Tsushima on May 27, 1905, Russian Admiral Rozhestvensky's flagship fired the first 12-inch guns at the Japanese flagship Mikasa at 7,000 meters. It is often held that these engagements demonstrated the importance of the  gun over its smaller counterparts, though some historians take the view that secondary batteries were just as important as the larger weapons when dealing with smaller fast moving torpedo craft. Such was the case, albeit unsuccessfully, when the Russian battleship Knyaz Suvorov at Tsushima had been sent to the bottom by destroyer launched torpedoes.

When dealing with a mixed 10- and 12-inch armament. The 1903–04 design also retained traditional triple-expansion steam engines.

As early as 1904, Jackie Fisher had been convinced of the need for fast, powerful ships with an all-big-gun armament. If Tsushima influenced his thinking, it was to persuade him of the need to standardise on  guns. Fisher's concerns were submarines and destroyers equipped with torpedoes, then threatening to outrange battleship guns, making speed imperative for capital ships.

It was to prove this revolutionary technology that Dreadnought was designed in January 1905, laid down in October 1905 and sped to completion by 1906. She carried ten 12-inch guns, had an 11-inch armor belt, and was the first large ship powered by turbines. She mounted her guns in five turrets; three on the centerline (one forward, two aft) and two on the wings, giving her at her launch twice the broadside of any other warship. She retained a number of 12-pound (3-inch, 76 mm) quick-firing guns for use against destroyers and torpedo-boats. Her armor was heavy enough for her to go head-to-head with any other ship in a gun battle, and conceivably win.

Dreadnought was to have been followed by three s, their construction delayed to allow lessons from Dreadnought to be used in their design. While Fisher may have intended Dreadnought to be the last Royal Navy battleship, the design was so successful he found little support for his plan to switch to a battlecruiser navy.

An American design, authorized in 1905 and laid down in December 1906, was another of the first dreadnoughts, but she and her sister, were not launched until 1908. Both used triple-expansion engines and had a superior layout of the main battery, dispensing with Dreadnoughts wing turrets. They thus retained the same broadside, despite having two fewer guns.

Arms race

From the 1906 launching of Dreadnought, an arms race with major strategic consequences was prompted. Major naval powers raced to build their own dreadnoughts. Possession of modern battleships was not only seen as vital to naval power, but also, as with nuclear weapons after World War II, represented a nation's standing in the world. Germany, France, Japan, Italy, Austria, and the United States all began dreadnought programmes; while the Ottoman Empire, Argentina, Russia, Brazil, and Chile commissioned dreadnoughts to be built in British and American yards.

World War I

By virtue of geography, the Royal Navy was able to use her imposing battleship and battlecruiser fleet to impose a strict and successful naval blockade of Germany and kept Germany's smaller battleship fleet bottled up in the North Sea: only narrow channels led to the Atlantic Ocean and these were guarded by British forces. Both sides were aware that, because of the greater number of British dreadnoughts, a full fleet engagement would be likely to result in a British victory. The German strategy was therefore to try to provoke an engagement on their terms: either to induce a part of the Grand Fleet to enter battle alone, or to fight a pitched battle near the German coastline, where friendly minefields, torpedo-boats and submarines could be used to even the odds. This did not happen however, due in large part to the necessity to keep submarines for the Atlantic campaign. Submarines were the only vessels in the Imperial German Navy able to break out and raid British commerce in force, but even though they sank many merchant ships, they could not successfully counter-blockade the United Kingdom; the Royal Navy successfully adopted convoy tactics to combat Germany's submarine counter-blockade and eventually defeated it. This was in stark contrast to Britain's successful blockade of Germany.

The first two years of war saw the Royal Navy's battleships and battlecruisers regularly "sweep" the North Sea making sure that no German ships could get in or out. Only a few German surface ships that were already at sea, such as the famous light cruiser , were able to raid commerce. Even some of those that did manage to get out were hunted down by battlecruisers, as in the Battle of the Falklands, December 7, 1914. The results of sweeping actions in the North Sea were battles including the Heligoland Bight and Dogger Bank and German raids on the English coast, all of which were attempts by the Germans to lure out portions of the Grand Fleet in an attempt to defeat the Royal Navy in detail. On May 31, 1916, a further attempt to draw British ships into battle on German terms resulted in a clash of the battlefleets in the Battle of Jutland. The German fleet withdrew to port after two short encounters with the British fleet. Less than two months later, the Germans once again attempted to draw portions of the Grand Fleet into battle. The resulting Action of 19 August 1916 proved inconclusive. This reinforced German determination not to engage in a fleet to fleet battle.

In the other naval theatres there were no decisive pitched battles. In the Black Sea, engagement between Russian and Ottoman battleships was restricted to skirmishes. In the Baltic Sea, action was largely limited to the raiding of convoys, and the laying of defensive minefields; the only significant clash of battleship squadrons there was the Battle of Moon Sound at which one Russian pre-dreadnought was lost. The Adriatic was in a sense the mirror of the North Sea: the Austro-Hungarian dreadnought fleet remained bottled up by the British and French blockade. And in the Mediterranean, the most important use of battleships was in support of the amphibious assault on Gallipoli.

In September 1914, the threat posed to surface ships by German U-boats was confirmed by successful attacks on British cruisers, including the sinking of three British armored cruisers by the German submarine  in less than an hour. The British Super-dreadnought  soon followed suit as she struck a mine laid by a German U-boat in October 1914 and sank. The threat that German U-boats posed to British dreadnoughts was enough to cause the Royal Navy to change their strategy and tactics in the North Sea to reduce the risk of U-boat attack. Further near-misses from submarine attacks on battleships and casualties amongst cruisers led to growing concern in the Royal Navy about the vulnerability of battleships.

HMS Audacious turned out to be the only dreadnought sunk by a submarine in World War I. While battleships were never intended for anti-submarine warfare, there was one instance of a submarine being sunk by a dreadnought battleship. HMS Dreadnought rammed and sank the German submarine U-29 on March 18, 1915, off the Moray Firth.

Whilst the escape of the German fleet from the superior British firepower at Jutland was effected by the German cruisers and destroyers successfully turning away the British battleships, the German attempt to rely on U-boat attacks on the British fleet failed.

Torpedo boats did have some successes against battleships in World War I, as demonstrated by the sinking of the British pre-dreadnought  by  during the Dardanelles Campaign and the destruction of the Austro-Hungarian dreadnought  by Italian motor torpedo boats in June 1918. In large fleet actions, however, destroyers and torpedo boats were usually unable to get close enough to the battleships to damage them. The only battleship sunk in a fleet action by either torpedo boats or destroyers was the obsolescent German pre-dreadnought . She was sunk by destroyers during the night phase of the Battle of Jutland.

The German High Seas Fleet, for their part, were determined not to engage the British without the assistance of submarines; and since the submarines were needed more for raiding commercial traffic, the fleet stayed in port for much of the war.

Inter-war period
For many years, Germany simply had no battleships. The Armistice with Germany required that most of the High Seas Fleet be disarmed and interned in a neutral port; largely because no neutral port could be found, the ships remained in British custody in Scapa Flow, Scotland. The Treaty of Versailles specified that the ships should be handed over to the British. Instead, most of them were scuttled by their German crews on June 21, 1919, just before the signature of the peace treaty. The treaty also limited the German Navy, and prevented Germany from building or possessing any capital ships.

The inter-war period saw the battleship subjected to strict international limitations to prevent a costly arms race breaking out.

While the victors were not limited by the Treaty of Versailles, many of the major naval powers were crippled after the war. Faced with the prospect of a naval arms race against the United Kingdom and Japan, which would in turn have led to a possible Pacific war, the United States was keen to conclude the Washington Naval Treaty of 1922. This treaty limited the number and size of battleships that each major nation could possess, and required Britain to accept parity with the U.S. and to abandon the British alliance with Japan. The Washington treaty was followed by a series of other naval treaties, including the First Geneva Naval Conference (1927), the First London Naval Treaty (1930), the Second Geneva Naval Conference (1932), and finally the Second London Naval Treaty (1936), which all set limits on major warships. These treaties became effectively obsolete on September 1, 1939, at the beginning of World War II, but the ship classifications that had been agreed upon still apply. The treaty limitations meant that fewer new battleships were launched in 1919–1939 than in 1905–1914. The treaties also inhibited development by imposing upper limits on the weights of ships. Designs like the projected British , the first American , and the Japanese —all of which continued the trend to larger ships with bigger guns and thicker armor—never got off the drawing board. Those designs which were commissioned during this period were referred to as treaty battleships.

Rise of air power

As early as 1914, the British Admiral Percy Scott predicted that battleships would soon be made irrelevant by aircraft. By the end of World War I, aircraft had successfully adopted the torpedo as a weapon. In 1921 the Italian general and air theorist Giulio Douhet completed a hugely influential treatise on strategic bombing titled The Command of the Air, which foresaw the dominance of air power over naval units.

In the 1920s, General Billy Mitchell of the United States Army Air Corps, believing that air forces had rendered navies around the world obsolete, testified in front of Congress that "1,000 bombardment airplanes can be built and operated for about the price of one battleship" and that a squadron of these bombers could sink a battleship, making for more efficient use of government funds. This infuriated the U.S. Navy, but Mitchell was nevertheless allowed to conduct a careful series of bombing tests alongside Navy and Marine bombers. In 1921, he bombed and sank numerous ships, including the "unsinkable" German World War I battleship  and the American pre-dreadnought .

Although Mitchell had required "war-time conditions", the ships sunk were obsolete, stationary, defenseless and had no damage control. The sinking of Ostfriesland was accomplished by violating an agreement that would have allowed Navy engineers to examine the effects of various munitions: Mitchell's airmen disregarded the rules, and sank the ship within minutes in a coordinated attack. The stunt made headlines, and Mitchell declared, "No surface vessels can exist wherever air forces acting from land bases are able to attack them." While far from conclusive, Mitchell's test was significant because it put proponents of the battleship against naval aviation on the defensive. Rear Admiral William A. Moffett used public relations against Mitchell to make headway toward expansion of the U.S. Navy's nascent aircraft carrier program.

Rearmament
The Royal Navy, United States Navy, and Imperial Japanese Navy extensively upgraded and modernized their World War I–era battleships during the 1930s. Among the new features were an increased tower height and stability for the optical rangefinder equipment (for gunnery control), more armor (especially around turrets) to protect against plunging fire and aerial bombing, and additional anti-aircraft weapons. External bulges were added to improve both buoyancy to counteract weight increase and provide underwater protection against mines and torpedoes. The Japanese rebuilt all of their battleships, plus their battlecruisers, with distinctive "pagoda" structures, though the  received a more modern bridge tower that would influence the new . Bulges were fitted, including steel tube arrays to improve both underwater and vertical protection along the waterline. Radar, which was effective beyond visual range and effective in complete darkness or adverse weather, was introduced to supplement optical fire control.

Even when war threatened again in the late 1930s, battleship construction did not regain the level of importance it had held in the years before World War I. The "building holiday" imposed by the naval treaties meant the capacity of dockyards worldwide had shrunk, and the strategic position had changed.

In Germany, the ambitious Plan Z for naval rearmament was abandoned in favor of a strategy of submarine warfare supplemented by the use of battlecruisers and commerce raiding (in particular by s). It was in the Mediterranean that navies remained most committed to battleship warfare. Neither navy built significant aircraft carriers. Japan, also prioritising aircraft carriers, nevertheless began work on three mammoth Yamatos (although the third, was later completed as a carrier) and a planned fourth was cancelled.

España (originally named Alfonso XIII), by then in reserve at the northwestern naval base of El Ferrol, fell into Nationalist hands in July 1936. The crew aboard Jaime I remained loyal to the Republic, killed their officers, who apparently supported Franco's attempted coup, and joined the Republican Navy. Thus each side had one battleship; however, the Republican Navy generally lacked experienced officers. The Spanish battleships mainly restricted themselves to mutual blockades, convoy escort duties, and shore bombardment, rarely in direct fighting against other surface units. In April 1937, España ran into a mine laid by friendly forces, and sank with little loss of life. In May 1937, Jaime I was damaged by Nationalist air attacks and a grounding incident. The ship was forced to go back to port to be repaired. There she was again hit by several aerial bombs. It was then decided to tow the battleship to a more secure port, but during the transport she suffered an internal explosion that caused 300 deaths and her total loss. Several Italian and German capital ships participated in the non-intervention blockade. On May 29, 1937, two Republican aircraft managed to bomb the German pocket battleship  outside Ibiza, causing severe damage and loss of life.  retaliated two days later by bombarding Almería, causing much destruction, and the resulting Deutschland incident meant the end of German and Italian participation in non-intervention.

World War II

The —an obsolete pre-dreadnought—fired the first shots of World War II with the bombardment of the Polish garrison at Westerplatte; and the final surrender of the Japanese Empire took place aboard a United States Navy battleship, . Between those two events, it had become clear that aircraft carriers were the new principal ships of the fleet and that battleships now performed a secondary role.

Battleships played a part in major engagements in Atlantic, Pacific and Mediterranean theaters; in the Atlantic, the Germans used their battleships as independent commerce raiders. However, clashes between battleships were of little strategic importance. The Battle of the Atlantic was fought between destroyers and submarines, and most of the decisive fleet clashes of the Pacific war were determined by aircraft carriers.

This engagement marked the only time a fleet carrier was sunk by surface gunnery. In the attack on Mers-el-Kébir, British battleships opened fire on the French battleships in the harbor near Oran in Algeria with their heavy guns. The fleeing French ships were then pursued by planes from aircraft carriers.

The subsequent years of the war saw many demonstrations of the maturity of the aircraft carrier as a strategic naval weapon and its effectiveness against battleships. The British air attack on the Italian naval base at Taranto sank one Italian battleship and damaged two more. The same Swordfish torpedo bombers played a crucial role in sinking the German battleship .

On December 7, 1941, the Japanese launched a surprise attack on Pearl Harbor. Within a short time, five of eight U.S. battleships were sunk or sinking, with the rest damaged. All three American aircraft carriers were out to sea, however, and evaded destruction. The sinking of the British battleship  and battlecruiser , demonstrated the vulnerability of a battleship to air attack while at sea without sufficient air cover, settling the argument begun by Mitchell in 1921. Both warships were under way and en route to attack the Japanese amphibious force that had invaded Malaya when they were caught by Japanese land-based bombers and torpedo bombers on December 10, 1941.

At many of the early crucial battles of the Pacific, for instance Coral Sea and Midway, battleships were either absent or overshadowed as carriers launched wave after wave of planes into the attack at a range of hundreds of miles. In later battles in the Pacific, battleships primarily performed shore bombardment in support of amphibious landings and provided anti-aircraft defense as escort for the carriers. Even the largest battleships ever constructed, Japan's , which carried a main battery of nine 18-inch (46 cm) guns and were designed as a principal strategic weapon, were never given a chance to show their potential in the decisive battleship action that figured in Japanese pre-war planning.

The last battleship confrontation in history was the Battle of Surigao Strait, on October 25, 1944, in which a numerically and technically superior American battleship group destroyed a lesser Japanese battleship group by gunfire after it had already been devastated by destroyer torpedo attacks. All but one of the American battleships in this confrontation had previously been sunk during the attack on Pearl Harbor and subsequently raised and repaired.  fired the last major-caliber salvo of this battle. In April 1945, during the battle for Okinawa, the world's most powerful battleship, the Yamato, was sent out on a suicide mission against a massive U.S. force and sunk by overwhelming pressure from carrier aircraft with nearly all hands lost.  After that, Japanese fleet remaining in the mainland was also destroyed by the US naval air force.

Cold War

After World War II, several navies retained their existing battleships, but they were no longer strategically dominant military assets. It soon became apparent that they were no longer worth the considerable cost of construction and maintenance and only one new battleship was commissioned after the war, . By the end of the 1950s, smaller vessel classes such as destroyers, which formerly offered no noteworthy opposition to battleships, now were capable of eliminating battleships from outside the range of the ship's heavy guns.

Both battleships proved resistant to nuclear air burst but vulnerable to underwater nuclear explosions. The  was taken by the Soviets as reparations and renamed Novorossiysk; she was sunk by a leftover German mine in the Black Sea on October 29, 1955. The two  ships were scrapped in 1956.

The United Kingdom's four surviving  ships were scrapped in 1957, and  followed in 1960. All other surviving British battleships had been sold or broken up by 1949. Brazil's  was scrapped in Genoa in 1953, and her sister ship  sank during a storm in the Atlantic en route to the breakers in Italy in 1951.

Argentina kept its two  ships until 1956 and Chile kept  (formerly ) until 1959. The Turkish battlecruiser  (formerly , launched in 1911) was scrapped in 1976 after an offer to sell her back to Germany was refused. Sweden had several small coastal-defense battleships, one of which, survived until 1970. The Soviets scrapped four large incomplete cruisers in the late 1950s, whilst plans to build a number of new s were abandoned following the death of Joseph Stalin in 1953. Hessen was taken over by the Soviet Union and renamed Tsel. She was scrapped in 1960. Schleswig-Holstein was renamed Borodino, and was used as a target ship until 1960. Schlesien, too, was used as a target ship. She was broken up between 1952 and 1957.

The s gained a new lease of life in the U.S. Navy as fire support ships. Radar and computer-controlled gunfire could be aimed with pinpoint accuracy to target. These were primarily used for shore bombardment, New Jersey firing nearly 6,000 rounds of 16 inch shells and over 14,000 rounds of 5 inch projectiles during her tour on the gunline, seven times more rounds against shore targets in Vietnam than she had fired in the Second World War.

As part of Navy Secretary John F. Lehman's effort to build a 600-ship Navy in the 1980s, and in response to the commissioning of Kirov by the Soviet Union, the United States recommissioned all four Iowa-class battleships. On several occasions, battleships were support ships in carrier battle groups, or led their own battleship battle group. These were modernized to carry Tomahawk (TLAM) missiles, with New Jersey seeing action bombarding Lebanon in 1983 and 1984, while  and  fired their 16-inch (406 mm) guns at land targets and launched missiles during Operation Desert Storm in 1991. Wisconsin served as the TLAM strike commander for the Persian Gulf, directing the sequence of launches that marked the opening of Desert Storm, firing a total of 24 TLAMs during the first two days of the campaign. The primary threat to the battleships were Iraqi shore-based surface-to-surface missiles; Missouri was targeted by two Iraqi Silkworm missiles, with one missing and another being intercepted by the British destroyer .

End of the battleship era

After  was stricken in 1962, the four Iowa-class ships were the only battleships in commission or reserve anywhere in the world. These last two battleships were finally stricken from the U.S. Naval Vessel Register in 2006. The Military Balance and Russian Foreign Military Review states the U.S. Navy listed one battleship in the reserve (Naval Inactive Fleet/Reserve 2nd Turn) in 2010. The Military Balance states the U.S. Navy listed no battleships in the reserve in 2014.

When the last Iowa-class ship was finally stricken from the Naval Vessel Registry, no battleships remained in service or in reserve with any navy worldwide. A number are preserved as museum ships, either afloat or in drydock. Missouri and New Jersey are museums at Pearl Harbor and Camden, New Jersey, respectively. Iowa is on display as an educational attraction at the Los Angeles Waterfront in San Pedro, California. Wisconsin now serves as a museum ship in Norfolk, Virginia. Massachusetts, which has the distinction of never having lost a man during service, is on display at the Battleship Cove naval museum in Fall River, Massachusetts. Texas, the first battleship turned into a museum, is normally on display at the San Jacinto Battleground State Historic Site, near Houston, but as of 2021 is closed for repairs. North Carolina is on display in Wilmington, North Carolina. Alabama is on display in Mobile, Alabama.

The only other 20th-century battleship on display is the Japanese pre-dreadnought . A replica of the ironclad battleship  was built by the Weihai Port Bureau in 2003 and is on display in Weihai, China.

Former battleships that were previously used as museum ships included , SMS Tegetthoff, and SMS Erzherzog Franz Ferdinand.

Strategy and doctrine

Doctrine

Battleships were the embodiment of sea power. For American naval officer Alfred Thayer Mahan and his followers, a strong navy was vital to the success of a nation, and control of the seas was vital for the projection of force on land and overseas. Mahan's theory, proposed in The Influence of Sea Power Upon History, 1660–1783 of 1890, dictated the role of the battleship was to sweep the enemy from the seas. While the work of escorting, blockading, and raiding might be done by cruisers or smaller vessels, the presence of the battleship was a potential threat to any convoy escorted by any vessels other than capital ships. This concept of "potential threat" can be further generalized to the mere existence (as opposed to presence) of a powerful fleet tying the opposing fleet down. This concept came to be known as a "fleet in being"—an idle yet mighty fleet forcing others to spend time, resource and effort to actively guard against it.

Mahan went on to say victory could only be achieved by engagements between battleships, which came to be known as the decisive battle doctrine in some navies, while targeting merchant ships (commerce raiding or guerre de course, as posited by the Jeune École) could never succeed.

Mahan was highly influential in naval and political circles throughout the age of the battleship, calling for a large fleet of the most powerful battleships possible. Mahan's work developed in the late 1880s, and by the end of the 1890s it had acquired much international influence on naval strategy; in the end, it was adopted by many major navies (notably the British, American, German, and Japanese). The strength of Mahanian opinion was important in the development of the battleships arms races, and equally important in the agreement of the Powers to limit battleship numbers in the interwar era.

The "fleet in being" suggested battleships could simply by their existence tie down superior enemy resources. This in turn was believed to be able to tip the balance of a conflict even without a battle. This suggested even for inferior naval powers a battleship fleet could have important strategic effect.

Tactics
While the role of battleships in both World Wars reflected Mahanian doctrine, the details of battleship deployment were more complex. Unlike ships of the line, the battleships of the late 19th and early 20th centuries had significant vulnerability to torpedoes and mines—because efficient mines and torpedoes did not exist before that—which could be used by relatively small and inexpensive craft. The Jeune École doctrine of the 1870s and 1880s recommended placing torpedo boats alongside battleships; these would hide behind the larger ships until gun-smoke obscured visibility enough for them to dart out and fire their torpedoes. While this tactic was made less effective by the development of smokeless propellant, the threat from more capable torpedo craft (later including submarines) remained. By the 1890s, the Royal Navy had developed the first destroyers, which were initially designed to intercept and drive off any attacking torpedo boats. During the First World War and subsequently, battleships were rarely deployed without a protective screen of destroyers.

Battleship doctrine emphasized the concentration of the battlegroup. In order for this concentrated force to be able to bring its power to bear on a reluctant opponent (or to avoid an encounter with a stronger enemy fleet), battlefleets needed some means of locating enemy ships beyond horizon range. This was provided by scouting forces; at various stages battlecruisers, cruisers, destroyers, airships, submarines and aircraft were all used. (With the development of radio, direction finding and traffic analysis would come into play, as well, so even shore stations, broadly speaking, joined the battlegroup.) So for most of their history, battleships operated surrounded by squadrons of destroyers and cruisers. The North Sea campaign of the First World War illustrates how, despite this support, the threat of mine and torpedo attack, and the failure to integrate or appreciate the capabilities of new techniques, seriously inhibited the operations of the Royal Navy Grand Fleet, the greatest battleship fleet of its time.

Strategic and diplomatic impact
The presence of battleships had a great psychological and diplomatic impact. Similar to possessing nuclear weapons today, the ownership of battleships served to enhance a nation's force projection.

Even during the Cold War, the psychological impact of a battleship was significant. In 1946, USS Missouri was dispatched to deliver the remains of the ambassador from Turkey, and her presence in Turkish and Greek waters staved off a possible Soviet thrust into the Balkan region. In September 1983, when Druze militia in Lebanon's Shouf Mountains fired upon U.S. Marine peacekeepers, the arrival of USS New Jersey stopped the firing. Gunfire from New Jersey later killed militia leaders.

Value for money
Battleships were the largest and most complex, and hence the most expensive warships of their time; as a result, the value of investment in battleships has always been contested. As the French politician Etienne Lamy wrote in 1879, "The construction of battleships is so costly, their effectiveness so uncertain and of such short duration, that the enterprise of creating an armored fleet seems to leave fruitless the perseverance of a people". The Jeune École school of thought of the 1870s and 1880s sought alternatives to the crippling expense and debatable utility of a conventional battlefleet. It proposed what would nowadays be termed a sea denial strategy, based on fast, long-ranged cruisers for commerce raiding and torpedo boat flotillas to attack enemy ships attempting to blockade French ports. The ideas of the Jeune École were ahead of their time; it was not until the 20th century that efficient mines, torpedoes, submarines, and aircraft were available that allowed similar ideas to be effectively implemented. The determination of powers such as Germany to build battlefleets with which to confront much stronger rivals has been criticized by historians, who emphasise the futility of investment in a battlefleet that has no chance of matching its opponent in an actual battle.

Former operators

 : lost its two Dingyuan-class battleships Dingyuan and Zhenyuan during the Battle of Weihaiwei in 1895.
 : lost its entire navy following the collapse of the Empire at the end of World War I.
 : its only battleship, KB Jugoslavija, was sunk by Italian frogmen during the 1918 Raid on Pula.
 : lost its entire navy upon its conquest by the Bolsheviks in 1921.
 : sole surviving battleship TCG Turgut Reis was decommissioned in 1933.
 : lost its two surviving s during the Spanish Civil War, both in 1937.
 : lost its two s during the German bombing of Salamis in 1941.
 : scuttled its two surviving s in 1945, during the closing months of World War II.
 : surrendered its sole surviving battleship, Nagato to the United States following World War II.
 : decommissioned its last battleship Minas Geraes in 1952.
 : decommissioned its two s in 1953.
 : decommissioned its last two s in 1956.
 : decommissioned its last battleship ARA Rivadavia in 1957.
 : decommissioned its last battleship, Almirante Latorre in 1958.
 : decommissioned its last battleship, HMS Vanguard in 1960.
 : decommissioned its last battleship, Jean Bart in 1970.
 : decommissioned its last battleship USS Missouri in 1992. She was the last active battleship of any navy.

See also

 Arsenal ship
 List of battleships
 List of sunken battleships
 List of ships of the Second World War
 List of battleships of the Second World War

Notes

References

 
 
 
 
 
 
 
 Corbett, Sir Julian. "Maritime Operations in the Russo-Japanese War 1904–1905." (1994). Originally Classified and in two volumes. .
 Corbett, Sir Julian. "Maritime Operations in the Russo-Japanese War 1904–1905." Volume I (2015) Originally published in January 1914. Naval Institute Press 
 Corbett, Sir Julian. "Maritime Operations in the Russo-Japanese War 1904–1905." Volume II (2015) Originally published in October 1915. Naval Institute Press 
 
 Friedman, Norman (2013). "Naval Firepower, Battleship Guns and Gunnery in the Dreadnaught Era." Seaforth Publishing, Great Britain. 
 
 
 
 
 
 
 
 
 
 
 
 
 
 
 
 
 
 
 
 Polmar, Norman. The Naval Institute Guide to the Ships and Aircraft of the US Fleet. 2001, Naval Institute Press. .

Further reading
 
 
 Mahan, Alred Thayer. Reflections, Historic and Other, Suggested by the Battle of the Japan Sea. By Captain A. T. Mahan, US Navy. US Naval Proceedings magazine; June 1906, volume XXXIV, number 2. United States Naval Institute Press.
 
 Taylor, Bruce, ed. The world of the battleship: The design and careers of capital ships of the world's navies, 1900–1950 (US Naval Institute Press, 2017) 224 pp

External links

 Comparison of the capabilities of seven World War II battleships
 Comparison of projected post-World War II battleship designs
 Development of U.S. battleships, with timeline graph
 Battleships in the Transportation Photographs Collection – University of Washington Library

 
Ship types